Electro-Precizia Stadium is a multi-use stadium in Săcele. It is the home ground of Precizia Săcele. It holds 3,500 people.

Football venues in Romania
Săcele